The 2010 North Hertfordshire Council election was held on 6 May 2010, at the same time as other local elections across England and the general election. Of the 49 seats on North Hertfordshire District Council, 19 were up for election, being the usual third of seats plus a by-election in Royston Palace ward.

The Conservatives gained one of the Royston Palace seats from the Liberal Democrats, whilst the Liberal Democrats gained Hitchin Bearton from the Labour leader, Martin Stears-Handscomb. The Conservatives therefore increased their majority on the council. The Conservative leader prior to the election was F. John Smith, who had been leader of the council since 1999. He did not stand for re-election. After the election, Lynda Needham was appointed  Conservative leader and leader of the council. Labour's new leader after the election was David Billing.

Overall results
The overall results were as follows:

Ward results
The results for each ward were as follows. Where the previous incumbent was standing for re-election they are marked with an asterisk(*).

The by-election in Royston Palace ward was due to the resignation of Liberal Democrat councillor Liz Beardwell.

References

2010 English local elections
2010